The Case Study Houses were experiments in American residential architecture sponsored by Arts & Architecture magazine, which commissioned major architects of the day, including Richard Neutra, Raphael Soriano, Craig Ellwood, Charles and Ray Eames, Pierre Koenig, Eero Saarinen, A. Quincy Jones, Edward Killingsworth, and Ralph Rapson to design and build inexpensive and efficient model homes for the United States residential housing boom caused by the end of World War II and the return of millions of soldiers.

The program ran intermittently from 1945 until 1966. The first six houses were built by 1948 and attracted more than 350,000 visitors.  While not all 36 designs were built, most of those that were constructed were built in Los Angeles, and one was built in San Rafael, Northern California and one in Phoenix, Arizona.  Of the unbuilt houses, #19 was to have been built in Atherton, in the San Francisco Bay Area, while #27 was to have been built on the east coast, in Smoke Rise, New Jersey.

A number of the houses appeared in the magazine in iconic black-and-white photographs by architectural photographer Julius Shulman.


List

Notes

Further reading 
 Entenza, John (January 1945) "Announcement: The Case Study House Program". Arts and Architecture
 McCoy, Esther. "Case Study Houses". 2nd edition. 1 June 1977, Hennessey & Ingalls
 
 
 
 Travers, David (January 2006) "About Arts & Architecture" Arts & Architecture website - accessed March 3, 2009

External links

 Case Study House Program of Arts & Architecture
 Article interviewing Rodney Walker's sons
 Info on CSH and Shulman at KCET
 Info on Case Study House 26, San Rafael

Housing in the United States
Houses in the United States
Landmarks in Los Angeles
Modernist architecture in the United States
Modernist architecture in California